Koch's triangle, named after the German pathologist Walter Koch, is an anatomical area located in the superficial paraseptal endocardium of the right atrium, which its boundaries are the coronary sinus orifice, tendon of Todaro, and septal leaflet of the right atrioventricular valve. It is anatomically significant because the atrioventricular node is located at the apex of the triangle. Also the elements anatomically near to it are the membranous septum and the Eustachian ridge. This triangle ends at the site of the coronary sinus orifice inferiorly and, continuous with the sub-Eustachian pouch. The tendon of Todaro forms the hypotenuse of the triangle and the base is formed by the coronary sinus orifice and the vestibule of the right atrium. Variations in the size of Koch's triangle are common.

References

Further reading

External links

Cardiac anatomy
Human anatomy
Anatomy named for one who described it